Par Zeytun (also Romanized as Par Zeytūn; also known as Pareh Zeytūn and Tork Salvīyeh) is a village in Par Zeytun Rural District, Meymand District, Firuzabad County, Fars Province, Iran. At the 2006 census, its population was 2,004, in 441 families.

References 

Populated places in Firuzabad County